The Southern Great Lakes Seismic Zone is a zone of low to moderate seismic activity surrounding Lake Erie and Lake Ontario in Canada and the United States.

See also
1998 Pymatuning earthquake

References

Seismic zones of Canada
Seismic zones of the United States
Geological history of the Great Lakes